James Weams' Tyneside Song Book 1887 is a chapbook style songbook, giving the lyrics of local, now historical songs. It was published by John B. Barnes, Printer, 5, Groat Market, Newcastle in 1887.

Details
 James Weams' Tyneside Song Book 1887 (full title - “No 1     James Weams’ Tyneside Song Book, Written and Sung by himself in the Principal Music Halls in the North.  -- : John B. Barnes, Printer, 5, Groat Market – 1887) is a Chapbook of Geordie folk songs consisting of 8  pages and 5 song lyric, all written (and sung – we are told in the title) by the author James Weams, published in 1877.

The publication 
It is, as the title suggests, a collection of songs  which would have been popular, or topical, at the date of publication. There is nothing  in the way of biographies of the author (other than comments on the front cover) or histories of the events.

The front cover of the book was as thus :-

No 1<br/ >	
JAMES WEAMS'<br/ >
TYNESIDE<br/ >
Song Book<br/ >
Written and Sung by himself in the Principal Music<br/ > Halls<br/ >
in the North<br/ >
CONTENTS - 
EJECTED<br/ >
NEIBORS BELAW<br/ >
LASS ON THE QUAY<br/ >
THE FOOTBALL CLUB<br/ >
THE GATESHEAD MASHER<br/ >
<br/ >	
Music to any of these Songs, 7 stamps<br/ >
<br/ >
PS. --- For Evening Concerts of Full Concert<br/ >
Parties  --- Address J WEAMS, Tyneside Comedian, <br/ >
103 Abbott Street, Gateshead<br/ >
<br/ >
: <br/ >
JOHN B. BARNES, Printer, 5, Groat Market<br/ >
1887<br/ >

Contents 
Are as below :-<br/ >

See also 
Geordie dialect words<br/ >
James Weams

References

External links
 Farne archives

English folk songs
Songs related to Newcastle upon Tyne
Northumbrian folklore
Chapbooks